Dorothy Mae Ann Wordsworth (25 December 1771 – 25 January 1855) was an English author, poet, and diarist. She was the sister of the Romantic poet William Wordsworth, and the two were close all their adult lives. Dorothy Wordsworth had no ambitions to be a public author, yet she left behind numerous letters, diary entries, topographical descriptions, poems, and other writings.

Life
She was born on Christmas Day in Cockermouth, Cumberland, in 1771. Despite the early death of her mother, Dorothy, William and their three brothers had a happy childhood. When in 1783 their father died and the children were sent to live with various relatives, Dorothy was sent alone to live with her aunt, Elizabeth Threlkeld, in Halifax, West Yorkshire. After she was able to be reunited with William, firstly at Racedown Lodge in Dorset in 1795 and afterwards (1797/98) at Alfoxton House in Somerset, they became inseparable companions. The pair lived in poverty at first, and would often beg for cast-off clothes from their friends.

William wrote of her in his famous Tintern Abbey poem:

Writing 
Wordsworth was primarily a diarist, and she also wrote poetry though without much interest in becoming an established poet. "I should detest the idea of setting myself up as an author," she once wrote, "give Wm. the Pleasure of it." She almost published her travel account with William to Scotland in 1803 Recollections of a Tour Made in Scotland, but a publisher was not found and it would not be published until 1874.

She wrote a very early account of an ascent of Scafell Pike in 1818, climbing the mountain in the company of her friend Mary Barker, Miss Barker's maid, and two local people to act as guide and porter. Dorothy's work was used in 1822 by her brother William, unattributed, in his popular guide book to the Lake District – and this was then copied by Harriet Martineau in her equally successful guide (in its fourth edition by 1876), but with attribution, if only to William Wordsworth. The account was quoted in other guidebooks as well. Consequently, this story was very widely read by the many visitors to the Lake District over more than half of the 19th century.

She never married, and after William married Mary Hutchinson in 1802, she continued to live with them. She was by now 31 and thought of herself as too old for marriage. In 1829 she fell seriously ill and was to remain an invalid for the remainder of her life. She died at eighty-three in 1855 near Ambleside, having spent the past twenty years in, according to the biographer Richard Cavendish, "a deepening haze of senility".

Her Grasmere Journal was published in 1897, edited by William Angus Knight. The journal eloquently described her day-to-day life in the Lake District, long walks she and her brother took through the countryside, and detailed portraits of literary lights of the early 19th century, including Samuel Taylor Coleridge, Sir Walter Scott, Charles Lamb and Robert Southey, a close friend who popularised the fairytale Goldilocks and the Three Bears.

The Grasmere Journal and Wordsworth's other works revealed how vital she was to her brother's success. William relied on her detailed accounts of nature scenes and borrowed freely from her journals. For example;

This passage is clearly brought to mind when reading William's 'Daffodils', where her brother, in this poem of two years later, describes what appears to be the shared experience in the journal as his own solitary observation. Her observations and descriptions have been considered to be as poetic if not more so than those of her brother. In her time she was described as being one of the few writers who have lived who could have provided so vivid and picturesque a scene.

Critical reception 
Dorothy Wordsworth's works came to light just as literary critics were beginning to re-examine women's role in literature. The success of the Grasmere Journal led to a renewed interest in Wordsworth, and several other journals and collections of her letters have since been published. Scholar Anne Mellor has identified Wordsworth as demonstrating a 'model of affiliation rather than a model of individual achievement',:186 more commonly associated with Romanticism.:32-33

Notes

Bibliography

 De Selincourt, Ernest. Dorothy Wordsworth: A Biography. The Clarendon Press, 1933.
 
 Gittings, Robert & Manton, Jo. Dorothy Wordsworth. Clarendon Press, 1985. 
 
 Jones, Kathleen. A Passionate Sisterhood: Wives, Sisters and Daughters of the Lakeland Poets. Virago Press 
 Levin, Susan M. Dorothy Wordsworth and Romanticism. McFarland and Co., 2009. 
 Macdonald MacLean, Catherine. Dorothy Wordsworth, the Early Years. New York: The Viking Press, 1932.
 Wilson, Frances. The Ballad of Dorothy Wordsworth: A Life. Faber and Faber, 2009.

External links

 
 
 

1771 births
1855 deaths
People from Cockermouth
English diarists
English women poets
Women diarists
William Wordsworth
Dorothy
19th-century English women writers
18th-century British women writers
18th-century British writers